JoAnne Bland (born July 29, 1952, in Selma, Alabama) is the co-founder and former director of the National Voting Rights Museum in Selma, Alabama. Bland was a highly active participant in the Civil Rights Movement from her earliest days, and was the youngest person to have been jailed during any civil rights demonstration during that period. Bland grew up in segregated Selma, Alabama, where she was not allowed to enter certain stores and was only allowed to go in the library and movie theater on days labeled "colored." As a result of growing up in segregation Bland lost her mother, who died in a "white" hospital waiting for a transfusion of "black blood." Her grandmother encouraged Bland and her sister to march and become a freedom fighter to fight for their freedom, even though her father disapproved due to his fear for their lives. Her father's objections did not stop Bland, who became active in the movement when she was eight years old. When she was eight years old, she attended a meeting with the Dallas County Voters League with her grandmother.

Early life and activism 
Bland began her activism in 1961, attending a freedom and voters' rights meeting presided over by Martin Luther King Jr. The Student Nonviolent Coordinating Committee (SNCC) members active in Selma organized local teenagers to participate in the movement, including marching on "Bloody Sunday" and "Turn Around Tuesday". On "Bloody Sunday", March 7, 1965, Bland witnessed fellow activists being beaten by the police and Alabama State Troopers.  By the time she was 11 years old, Bland had been arrested and documented 13 times. Bland's first time being arrested was when she was eight years old at the beginning of her activism.
During the march while Bland witnessed people being beaten, they could not get away from police as they moved in from the sides, back, and front. Bland's sister, Lynda Blackmon Lowery, was the youngest person that participated in the march, she was 14 years old at that time. Lowery saw people putting Bland in the back of a white car and she thought her sister was dead, but when she got to the car, she soon realized that Bland just fainted. When Bland woke up, she could feel her sister's blood dripping on her face from being hit on the head many times. Bland helped protect white Northerners who chose to participant in the march, they included ministers and college students. On March 21, 1965, she marched from Selma to Montgomery and that same year in August the Voting Rights Act was signed. Bland was one of seven black students who integrated A. G. Parish High School in Alabama.

Career 
Bland remains active in several local and regional organizations, including the Southern Christian Leadership Conference, the NAACP, the Sunflower Project, Ladies With A Mission, and her church, Ward Chapel in Prattville, Alabama. She has spoken at conferences and workshops for the Smithsonian Institution in Washington, DC, and in the states of Maine, Wisconsin, Vermont, Minnesota, Georgia, Pennsylvania, Texas, South Carolina, and throughout Alabama.

She served in the United States Army and is a graduate of the College of Staten Island, where she received a Bachelor of Arts degree.
She was a co-founder of the Voting Rights Museum located across the Edmund Pettus Bridge, but she left the museum in 2007. After leaving the museum Bland created Journeys for the Soul located in Alabama, Bland takes individuals of all age groups, on a journey to the past. Through educational tours and lectures, she teaches the history of the Civil Rights Movement and the struggle to achieve Voting Rights.  
Bland received the Robert O. Cooper Peace and Justice Fellowship on April 10, 2014, at an event hosted by SMU. Bland uses her platform to promote the importance of voting and being an active participant in elections. As an activist Bland made it her mission to teach the future generation to about the past of segregation. Bland was a keynote speaker at the celebration of Martin Luther King Jr. at UW-Eau Claire, February 2019.

Bland is featured in the 2019 documentary on voter suppression, After Selma, directed by Loki Mulholland, where she describes her childhood, activism, and the ongoing struggle for equal voting rights in the United States.

References

Activists for African-American civil rights
Living people
Activists from Selma, Alabama
College of Staten Island alumni
United States Army soldiers
1952 births